Giovanni Fiore (born August 13, 1996) is a Canadian professional ice hockey centre. He is currently playing for Eisbären Berlin in the Deutsche Eishockey Liga (DEL).

Playing career
Fiore played minor ice hockey with the Laval Patriotes, and participated in the 2009 Quebec International Pee-Wee Hockey Tournament with them. He later played midget hockey in the QMAAA with the Laval-Montréal Rousseau Royal before embarking on major junior hockey in the Quebec Major Junior Hockey League with the Acadie-Bathurst Titan, Drummondville Voltigeurs, Shawinigan Cataractes and the Cape Breton Screaming Eagles.

Undrafted, and after five seasons in the QMJHL, Fiore signed his first professional contract in agreeing to a three-year, entry-level contract with the Anaheim Ducks on April 19, 2017.

Through an impressive first training camp with the Ducks, Fiore was amongst the last cuts re-assigned to AHL affiliate, the San Diego Gulls, to begin the 2017–18 season. On October 5, 2017, he was soon recalled to the Ducks and later made his NHL debut in a 3–2 overtime defeat to the Philadelphia Flyers on October 8, 2017. After making his solitary appearance for the Ducks, he was re-assigned to AHL affiliate, the San Diego Gulls, for the remainder of the season, collecting 18 goals and 30 points in 65 games.

In the following 2018–19 season, Fiore continued in the AHL with the Gulls and contributed with 11 points in 23 games before he was traded by the Ducks to the Arizona Coyotes in exchange for Trevor Murphy on December 28, 2018. He was immediately re-assigned to continue in the AHL with the Tucson Roadrunners.

Approaching the final year of his contract with the Coyotes in the 2019–20 season, Fiore was unable to impress through pre-season and was re-assigned by Arizona to their secondary affiliate, the Rapid City Rush of the ECHL. Fiore recorded 29 points through 24 games in the ECHL without recall to the AHL. On December 13, 2019, Fiore was placed on unconditional waivers and mutually released from his contract with the Arizona Coyotes. On December 20, 2019, he returned to the AHL after he was signed on a professional try-out contract with the Toronto Marlies, affiliate to the Toronto Maple Leafs. Fiore was unable to make an impact with the Marlies, posting 1 goal in just 4 games before leaving the club to sign a PTO with fellow AHL club, the Ontario Reign, on February 3, 2020. Fiore registered 3 goals in 12 contests with the Reign before the remainder of the season was cancelled due to the COVID-19 pandemic.

As a free agent, Fiore opted to pursue a career abroad, signing his first European contract in agreeing to a one-year for the remainder of the 2020–21 season with German club, Eisbären Berlin of the DEL, on December 3, 2020.

Career statistics

Awards and honours

References

External links
 

1996 births
Living people
Acadie–Bathurst Titan players
Anaheim Ducks players
Canadian ice hockey left wingers
Cape Breton Screaming Eagles players
Drummondville Voltigeurs players
Eisbären Berlin players
Ontario Reign (AHL) players
Ice hockey people from Quebec
Rapid City Rush players
San Diego Gulls (AHL) players
Shawinigan Cataractes players
Sportspeople from Laval, Quebec
Toronto Marlies players
Tucson Roadrunners players
Undrafted National Hockey League players